Joseph G. Allen is an American academic and public health expert. He is currently the director of the Healthy Buildings program at Harvard University's T. H. Chan School of Public Health, where he is also an associate professor.

Early life and education 
Allen graduated from Boston College with a degree in biology, and from Boston University School of Public Health with a Master of Public Health degree (environmental health) and a Doctor of Science degree (exposure assessment, environmental epidemiology, biostatistics).

Career 
Much of Allen's work revolves around the emerging concept of healthy buildings and the impact of buildings and indoor air quality on human health. Allen co-authored the book Healthy Buildings: How Indoor Spaces Can Make You Sick - or Keep You Well (Harvard Press), with John Macomber from Harvard Business School. The New York Times named the book a “Top 8 Book for Healthy Living,” and Fortune named it a book of the year.

Allen is a member of the Scientific and Medical Editorial Review Panel of the American Lung Association.

Covid-19 
Allen served on The Lancet Covid-19 Commission and was Chair of The Lancet Covid-19 Commission Task Force on Safe Work, Safe School, and Safe Travel. He served on Harvard's Coronavirus Advisory and Governor Charlie Baker's (MA) Medical Advisory Board, and was an advisor to The White House Covid-19 Response Team. During the COVID-19 pandemic, much of his public work concerned the role of building factors in public health, especially in the context of schools and the workforce returning to office spaces after an extended period of remote working during the pandemic. He publicized these considerations through op-eds in major publications, as well as with appearances on television news programs, and often used these platforms to correct misinformation surrounding transmission of the virus on surfaces and in the air.

Through the Healthy Buildings program at Harvard, Allen was involved in propagating research on airborne transmission of COVID-19, collaborating with aerosol researchers including Linsey Marr, Donald Milton, and Lidia Morawska to incorporate the results of their research into public policy proposals on building design and operation.

Climate Change 
Allen studies the role that buildings play in climate change and strategies to off-set building-related emissions. He has published several articles on the climate and health co-benefits of energy-efficiency measures in buildings. He authored an article in Harvard Business Review titled, "Designing buildings that are both well-ventilated and green," that provides recommendations for how to achieve a healthy building that is also energy-efficient.

References

External links 

 Joseph Allen's Harvard Faculty Website
 Joseph G. Allen's Harvard Catalyst Website with publications

Living people
Harvard School of Public Health faculty
Morrissey College of Arts & Sciences alumni
Boston University School of Public Health alumni
American health educators
COVID-19 researchers
Year of birth missing (living people)